The 1994 NCAA Division I women's volleyball tournament began with 48 teams and ended on December 17, 1994, when Stanford defeated UCLA 3 games to 1 in the NCAA championship match.

Stanford won the program's second title with the win. Led by freshman Kristin Folkl, Stanford defeated the Bruins 15-10, 5-15, 16-14, 15-13. The meeting with UCLA was the fifth straight year Stanford and UCLA met in the NCAA tournament.

Play-in games

Records

Brackets

West regional

Northwest regional

Mideast regional

South regional

Final Four - Frank Erwin Center, Austin, Texas

See also
NCAA Women's Volleyball Championship

References

NCAA Women's Volleyball Championship
NCAA
NCAA Division I women's volleyball tournament
Volleyball in Texas
December 1994 sports events in the United States
Sports competitions in Texas